BSEU may refer to:

Organisations
 Belarus State Economic University
 Botswana Saving Bank Employees' Union